Xylotrechus lengi is a species of beetle in the family Cerambycidae. It was described by Schaeffer in 1908.

References

Xylotrechus
Beetles described in 1908